The 2000 President's Cup was a men's tennis tournament played on Hard in Tashkent, Uzbekistan that was part of the International Series of the 2000 ATP Tour. It was the fourth edition of the tournament and was held from 11 September – 17 September.

Seeds
Champion seeds are indicated in bold text while text in italics indicates the round in which those seeds were eliminated.

Draw

Finals

References

Doubles
ATP Tashkent Open